The Berwyn range (Welsh: Y Berwyn or Mynydd y Berwyn) is an isolated and sparsely populated area of moorland in the northeast of Wales, roughly bounded by Llangollen in the northeast, Corwen in the northwest, Bala in the southwest, and Oswestry in the southeast.

Description
The area is wild and largely vegetated by heather about one metre thick, with some acidic grassland and bracken.  It is not very popular for hill-walking or scrambling since the peaks are lower than those in nearby Snowdonia. However, the topmost peaks are rugged and have a distinctive character. Nearby towns include Llangollen and Corwen, which are popular tourist destinations.

Cadair Berwyn is the highest point in the Berwyn range, and the highest point in Wales outside the National Parks. Cadair Bronwen and Foel Cedig to the west are the two Marilyns that form the Berwyn range.

The mountain lies on main ridge of the Berwyn range which runs north–south. The eastern side of the ridge is characterised by steep drops and crags including Craig Berwyn north of the summit and Craig y Llyn to the south. Craig y Llyn forms the headwall of a cwm, and it is to this that the word cadair (chair in Welsh) presumably refers. Further north along the ridge is Cadair Bronwen, whilst to south the ridge continues to Moel Sych (Welsh pronunciation: [ˈmɔil ˈsɨːx], meaning "dry hill").

It is often reported that Moel Sych,  along the ridge, is of equal height, but Cadair Berwyn's spot height on the Ordnance Survey maps, where the trig point stands, is not the true summit. This summit is listed as Cadair Berwyn New Top on the Nuttall list.

Several other summits in the area are listed as Hewitts or Nuttalls, including Foel Wen ([ˈvɔil ˈwɛn], Welsh for white hill) and Mynydd Tarw ([ˈmɐnɨð ˈtæɾu], bull mountain).

The summit lies on the border between Powys and Denbighshire, and is the highest point in Denbighshire. The northern end of Craig Berwyn is the highest point in Wrexham County Borough.

History
There is a standing stone at SJ080337 near the summit between Cadair Berwyn and Tomle. It was re-erected in June 2008 by High Sports.

The Berwyn range also played its part in causing King Henry II of England to turn back during his invasion of Gwynedd in 1165. Rather than taking the usual route along the northern coastal plain, his army invaded from Oswestry and took a route over the Berwyns.  The English invasion faced an alliance of Welsh princes led by King Owain Gwynedd, but there was little fighting – endless days of heavy rain forced the English to retreat.

Supposed UFO crash

At 8.38 pm on 23 January 1974, an earthquake of magnitude 3.5 was felt over a wide area of north Wales and as far as Liverpool. Since earthquakes are uncommon in the UK, it was not generally recognized for what it was, and since a number of unusual lights in the sky had been observed the same evening, it was considered possible that an aircraft had crashed, or a meteorite had impacted. Further confusion was caused by lights seen on the Berwyn Mountains, which subsequently turned out to have belonged to poachers.

Ecology
The area supports substantial populations of upland birds including raptors, such as the hen harrier (Circus cyaneus), merlin (Falco columbarius), and peregrine (Falco peregrinus) (about 14–18 breeding pairs of each species, 1%–2% of the total British population), and for this reason it is a Special Protection Area classified in accordance with the European Union's Birds Directive. Much of the area is also designated a national nature reserve and a Site of Special Scientific Interest and forms part of the Berwyn and South Clwyd Mountains Special Area of Conservation. Other wildlife include short-eared owl, raven, buzzard, polecat and golden plover.

Etymology
The scholar T. Gwynn Jones suggested that a possible origin of the term "Berwyn" was "Bryn(iau) Gwyn (ap Nudd)", where the Middle Welsh word "bre" (hill) had mutated to Ber + Gwyn, Gwyn ap Nudd being the mythological King of the Tylwyth Teg (Fair Folk, or fairies). A more likely etymology is "bar" (summit, crest) + "gwyn" (white), with the "a" in "bar" showing i-affection as a result of the "y" in "gwyn", therefore changing from "a" to "e"; the word also shows soft mutation of the letter "g" (which is deleted under soft mutation).

Peaks

References

Landforms of Denbighshire
Landforms of Wrexham County Borough
Landforms of Powys
Landforms of Gwynedd
Mountain ranges of Wales
National nature reserves in Wales
Special Protection Areas in Wales
Sites of Special Scientific Interest in Clwyd
Sites of Special Scientific Interest in East Gwynedd
Sites of Special Scientific Interest in Montgomery